NVZ may refer to

Nitrate vulnerable zone, a conservation designation in the United Kingdom
Non-volley zone in the game of Pickleball
Northern Volcanic Zone, a zone of the Andes extending from Colombia to Ecuador
North Volcanic Zone, one of the volcanic zones of Iceland